Several species share the specific name poseidon, the species descriptor in a binomial name.

These include:

 Flax poseidon (F. poseidon), a moth
 Hypaeus poseidon (H. poseidon), a spider
 Lepidochrysops poseidon (L. poseidon), a butterfly
 Polyommatus poseidon (P. poseidon), a butterfly
 Thyropygus poseidon (T. poseidon), a millipede

See also
 Poseidon (disambiguation)